Pionair Australia is a passenger and cargo airline based at Bankstown Airport in Sydney.

History 
Pionair Australia specialises in both dangerous and non-dangerous cargo transport, FIFO operations and charter transport. The airline holds an IAOC permit, allowing the airline to operate and carry passengers and cargo worldwide. From 2016 to early 2020, Pionair Australia operated Virgin Australia Cargo flights under contract via TNT.  Since March 2020 the contract has moved to Qantas and Pionair is operating up to 4 Bae146 freighters on the same schedule for Qantas Cargo and TNT.

Fleet 

The Pionair Australia fleet consists of the following aircraft:

Fleet development
The first of two Embraer E190-E2 were delivered in January 2020 for operations on behalf of Air Kiribati, scheduled to start in mid-2020 (now delayed due to COVID-19). These aircraft are brand new. One used Embraer E190-E1 (built in 2011) has been purchased by Pionair and is due for delivery November 2020 for company growth and expansion. As of November 2020, Pionair also operated nine British Aerospace BAe146 aircraft, five of which are freighters and the remaining four are passenger aircraft. 

In February 2022, it was announced that Pionair Australia had acquired two surplus Royal Air Force British Aerospace BAe 146 transports. 

The airline previously also operated two Convair 580s within Australia. Both of the airline's Convair 580s are preserved at the Parkes HARS Museum.

See also
List of airlines of Australia

References

External links

Cargo airlines of Australia
Companies based in Sydney